Watch Rock Park is a 25-acre park in Old Lyme, Connecticut owned by the Old Lyme Conservation Trust.  It is located off Joel Road at the point where the Duck River (Connecticut) flows into the Connecticut River, just above the point where the Connecticut flows into Long Island Sound.

References

Old Lyme, Connecticut
Parks in New London County, Connecticut